University of Kassala (in Arabic جامعة كسلا, Jām'iat Kassala).
A public university located in Kassala, Sudan, one of the Sudanese universities established to provide higher education services to the people of eastern Sudan in the field of engineering, medicine, education, computer science, economy, accounting and management. The university was established by Republican Decree No. (67), according to which the University of the East was divided into three universities: University of Kassala , University of Gadarif and Red Sea University.

Colleges
Medicine and Health, Engineering, Computer Science and IT, Economics and Administrative Sciences, Education, Agriculture and Natural Resources, Islamic Studies, Science, Law, Animal production sciences and technology, Community Development.

Researches centers
Eastern Sudan Heritage and Languages Research Center, Medical Research Center, and IT Research Center.

References 

Universities and colleges in Sudan
Kassala (state)